Standard of care is a legal term in tort law

Standard of care or Standards of care may also refer to:
 Standard of care in English law 
 Standards of Care for the Health of Transsexual, Transgender, and Gender Nonconforming People
 Medical standard of care